"Teacher, Teacher" is a 1958 song by Johnny Mathis, with words by Al Stillman and music by Robert Allen. As a double-A sided single along with "All the Time", it peaked at No. 21 on the US Most Played by Jockeys chart in The Billboard, and No. 27 in the UK. It was an early example of the teacher crush genre, with the lyrics "Teacher, teacher.... make me the teacher's pet". The song was included on the album More Johnny's Greatest Hits the next year.

References

1958 songs
1958 singles
Johnny Mathis songs
Songs with lyrics by Al Stillman
Songs with music by Robert Allen (composer)